The Baton Rouge bus boycott was a boycott of city buses launched on June 19, 1953, by African-American residents of Baton Rouge, Louisiana who were seeking integration of the system. They made up about 80% of the ridership of the city buses in the early 1950s but, under Jim Crow rules, black people were forced to sit in the back of the bus, even when the front of the bus was empty. State laws prohibited black citizens from owning private buses outside the city systems.

Background
Activists proposed to the city that black riders would be allowed to ride in the front of the bus, but voluntarily refrain from sitting next to whites. The City Council initially approved this concept and passed Ordinance 222. But the cadre of all-white bus drivers refused to enforce the ordinance, and they went on strike. The ordinance was overturned after the strike went on four days. The drivers returned to work after the Louisiana Attorney General overturned the ordinance and declared victory.

Rev. T. J. Jemison helped organize the United Defense League and a bus boycott after the integration ordinance was overturned. Black residents met in four mass meetings and raised $6,000 for the boycott in just two days. About 14 residents refused to board the city's buses and instead accepted rides in free taxis set up by the community and in private car pools. About 25 private cars were used to transport people while the boycott was in force.

After six days, the boycott ended when the city passed Ordinance 251. It directed that black riders would fill the bus from the rear forward and whites from the front toward the back. Blacks and whites were prohibited from sitting next to each other in the same row. Two front seats were declared off-limits to black riders, and only black riders could occupy the wide rear seat that spanned the back of the bus.

The boycott had a very small impact on the city's transportation system and on the broader civil rights movement. Rev. Martin Luther King Jr. became aware of the bus boycott and spoke with Rev. Jemison about the fight for social justice in Baton Rouge. He especially wanted to discuss the free car ride system, which was a key part of enforcing the Baton Rouge bus boycott.  The 1953 Baton Rouge Bus boycott served as a model for the internationally known 1955 Montgomery bus boycott. The 1953 Baton Rouge Bus boycott also inspired residents to mobilize around other issues, such as securing the right to vote.

In recognition of the importance of the 1953 Baton Rouge Bus Boycott in African-American history and world history, the Toni Morrison Society's "Bench by the Road" project selected Baton Rouge as a site to memorialize. The project places benches at sites with historical significance for people of African ancestry. The permanent site of the bench commemorating the bus boycott is the McKinley High School Alumni Center.

Further reading
Beauchamp, M. (2008). Baton Rouge Bus Boycott. ABC-CLIO, LLC.
Joiner, L. L. (2003). "Baton Rouge Bus Boycott Paved Way for King's Montgomery Effort". Crisis (15591573), 110(4), 7.
MELTON, C; RICHARD, CE; JOSEPH, JA. Signpost to Freedom. [videorecording] : The 1953 Baton Rouge bus boycott. [Baton Rouge, La.] : Louisiana Educational Television Authority, c2004., 2004.

References

External links
Civil Rights Movement History & Timeline, 1953
The first Civil Rights Bus Boycott | African American Registry
Remembering the Boycott
Rev. T. J. Jemison, Civil Rights Leader Who Organized Early Boycott, Dies at 95
Martha White, 99, Dies; Before Rosa Parks, She Sparked a Bus Boycott 

1953 in Louisiana
History of Baton Rouge, Louisiana
Bus transportation in Louisiana
Boycotts
Civil rights movement
Civil rights protests in the United States
1953 protests
African-American history in Baton Rouge, Louisiana
Anti-black racism in the United States
Protests in the United States
June 1953 events in the United States
History of racism in Louisiana